Sudan has a conflict in the Darfur area of western Sudan. The Khartoum government had, in the past, given sanctuary to trans-national Islamic terrorists, but, according to the 9/11 Commission Report, ousted al-Qaeda and cooperated with the US against such groups while simultaneously involving itself in human rights abuses in Darfur. There are also transborder issues between Chad and Darfur, and, to a lesser extent, with the Central African Republic.

"These conflicts lead to strange alliances with the US. Once eager hosts of Osama bin Laden, Sudan's Islamist movement has since split, with the two factions now fighting a proxy war in Darfur. In the 1990s, the U.S. rejected every initiative offered by the Sudanese to cooperate on counter-terrorism issues, including an offer to extradite Osama bin Laden. The Sudanese government's willingness to share its copious intelligence on Al-Qaeda has now bought it some immunity from responsibility for the atrocities in Darfur.

"The CIA has initiated close contacts with Sudanese intelligence director MG Salah Gosh, who has also been identified in Congress as a war crimes suspect for his exploits in Darfur. In a sign of growing cooperation many Sudanese prisoners at Guantanamo Bay have been released to Sudanese authorities. Besides intelligence sharing, the U.S. is also keen to protect the peace agreement that will end the north–south civil war and release vast new reserves of oil onto the market.

"Sudan's western province is widely viewed in Khartoum as a proxy battle-ground for the continuing struggle by President al-Bashir and the security apparatus against Hassan al-Turabi's Islamist following. Indeed, the terror that has descended on Darfur reveals a shocking cynicism both on the part of the government and the leading opposition party. The atrocities of the government-backed Janjaweed militias have occurred under the cover of negotiations to end the war in South Sudan, which no party (especially the United States after its considerable diplomatic investment) wishes to derail. The growing relationship between the CIA and the Sudanese security chiefs (some of whom were named in Congress as suspects in Darfur war-crimes) has effectively sidelined U.S. influence in Darfur.

"The Sudanese government has considerable military power that would enable it to restore order in Darfur, but is understandably reluctant to divert its resources from the South until the peace process there has been completed. Offers of peacekeeping assistance from the SPLA have been met with charges of SPLA military aid to the rebels in Darfur. The strategy of the Sudanese security forces in Darfur follows a pattern established in the war in the South; divide the opposition through bribery and the inflammation of ethnic or tribal differences while arming pro-government militias. The resulting death or displacement of the population eventually isolates rebel units from sources of support.

"In some sense the people of Darfur are being made to pay the price for the private humiliation of Sudan’s security apparatus, resentful that it has had to come to the negotiating table with the South Sudan’s (SPLA). The terms of the peace settlement with the SPLA virtually ensure further revolts elsewhere in Sudan to wring similar considerations from the highly centralized government in Khartoum. Unfortunately, the manipulation of race and Islam is likely to continue to substitute for a willingness to create an equitable distribution of wealth and power.

Timeline of activities

1995
Starting in 1995, Sudan offered extradition or interviews of arrested al-Qaeda operatives, as well as allowing access to the extensive files of Sudanese intelligence. "According to a CIA source, "This represents the worst single intelligence failure in this whole terrible business. It is the key to the whole thing right now. It is reasonable to say that had we had this data we may have had a better chance of preventing the attacks." He said the blame for the failure lay in the 'irrational hatred' the Clinton administration felt for the source of the proffered intelligence – Sudan, where bin Laden and his leading followers were based from 1992 to 1996. He added that after a slow thaw in relations which began last year, it was only now that the Sudanese information was being properly examined for the first time."

"They also kept his followers under close surveillance. One US source who has seen the files on bin Laden's men in Khartoum said some were 'an inch and a half thick'. They included photographs, and information on their families, backgrounds and contacts. Most were 'Afghan Arabs', Saudis, Yemenis and Egyptians who had fought with bin Laden against the Soviets in Afghanistan.

"'We know them in detail,' said one Sudanese source. 'We know their leaders, how they implement their policies, how they plan for the future. We have tried to feed this information to American and British intelligence so they can learn how this thing can be tackled.'

In 2000, "the CIA and FBI, following four years of Sudanese entreaties, sent a joint investigative team to establish whether Sudan was in fact a sponsor of terrorism. Last May, it gave Sudan a clean bill of health. However, even then, it made no effort to examine the voluminous files on bin Laden."

1996
According to The Washington Post, the US government decided, in 1996, to send nearly $20 million of military equipment through the 'front-line' states of Ethiopia, Eritrea and Uganda to help the Sudanese opposition overthrow the Khartoum regime." While this is indicative of Clinton Administration policy, the article did not explicitly mention CIA as part of the operation, and, if this is basically military aid, the Defense and State Departments would normally handle the transactions. "U.S. officials also deny that the equipment is specifically earmarked for the Sudanese rebels, despite the declared anti-Khartoum policies of the recipient governments. "We are assisting these governments in their own defense. Nothing we are giving them is to be used for any other purpose," said George Moose, Assistant Secretary of State for African Affairs."

"In 1996, following intense pressure from Saudi Arabia and the US, Sudan agreed to expel bin Laden and up to 300 of his associates. Sudanese intelligence believed this to be a great mistake. 'There we could keep track of him, read his mail,' the source went on. 'Once we kicked him out and he went to ground in Afghanistan, he couldn't be tracked anywhere.'

After the 1998 bombings of US embassies and commercial buildings in Nairobi, Kenya and Dar es Salaam, Tanzania, Sudan sent a memo, obtained by the Observer, to Louis Freeh, former director of the FBI, and "announces the arrest of two named bin Laden operatives held the day after the bombings after they crossed the Sudanese border from Kenya. They had cited the manager of a Khartoum leather factory owned by bin Laden as a reference for their visas, and were held after they tried to rent a flat overlooking in the US embassy in Khartoum, where they were thought to be planning an attack.

"US sources have confirmed that the FBI wished to arrange their immediate extradition. However, Clinton's Secretary of State, Madeleine Albright, forbade it. She had classed Sudan as a 'terrorist state,' and three days later US missiles blasted the al-Shifa medicine factory in Khartoum. The US wrongly claimed it was owned by bin Laden and making chemical weapons. In fact, it supplied 60 per cent of Sudan's medicines, and had contracts to make vaccines with the UN.

"Even then, Sudan held the suspects for a further three weeks, hoping the US would both perform their extradition and take up the offer to examine their bin Laden database. Finally, the two men were deported to Pakistan. Their present whereabouts are unknown.

2001
In September, Walter H. Kansteiner, III, the US Assistant Secretary of State for Africa, FBI and CIA representatives, and Yahia Hussien Baviker, the Sudanese intelligence deputy chief met in London to discuss sharing information. "However, although the intelligence channel between Sudan and the United States is now open, and the last UN sanctions against the African state have been removed, The Observer has evidence that a separate offer made by Sudanese agents in Britain to share intelligence with MI6 has been rejected. This follows four years of similar rebuffs. "If someone from MI6 comes to us and declares himself, the next day he can be in Khartoum,' said a Sudanese government source. 'We have been saying this for years.'

2005
Democracy Now reported on May 3, 2005: 
The Los Angeles Times has revealed that the U.S. has quietly forged a close intelligence partnership with Sudan despite the government’s role in the mass killings in Darfur.
This reflected White House level policy tradeoffs between the competing priorities of transnational terrorism and national human rights.

2006
Human Rights Watch addressed this balancing act, referring to the CIA in the balancing act with Salah Gosh: "The January 9, 2005 Comprehensive Peace Agreement ending the twenty-one-year civil war between the Sudanese government and southern rebels has brought little significant improvement to Sudan in the area of human rights. Implementation of the agreement was delayed by several factors, including the sudden death of southern rebel leader Dr. John Garang. As part of the agreement, the Sudanese government lifted the state of emergency throughout Sudan (with the exception of Darfur and the east) but attacks on villages in Darfur continued, and killings, rape, torture, looting of civilian livestock and other property took place on a regular basis. Arbitrary arrests and detentions, executions without fair trials, and harassment of human rights defenders and other activists remained a feature of Sudanese policy in both Darfur and other areas of Sudan. For the first time, however, the U.N. Security Council made use of its power to refer the situation of Darfur to the International Criminal Court (ICC) in March 2005.

"Throughout 2005, international policy towards Sudan vacillated between condemnation and appeasement. This reflected the varying interests at stake, such as the implementation of the north-southern peace agreement, ending the atrocities in Darfur, and even regional counterterrorism efforts. The U.S. government was a prime example of this policy schizophrenia. U.S. officials vociferously condemn the continuing attacks, but the U.S. Central Intelligence Agency invited Sudanese security chief Salah Gosh, a likely indictee before the ICC for war crimes committed in Darfur, to Washington in April 2005 to discuss Sudanese-U.S. counterterrorism interests. 
 
"Divided interests regarding Sudan were prevalent not just bilaterally among western governments, but also within the United Nations Security Council. The single most important achievement of the Security Council was the historic referral of Darfur to the ICC on March 31, 2005. In June the ICC announced that it would investigate the crimes in Darfur. In a second March 2005 resolution, the Security Council established a sanctions committee to identify individuals who violated an arms embargo on Darfur and who committed abuses; the sanctions would not apply retroactively. Despite the continuing abuses in Darfur throughout 2005, however, the Security Council was prevented from enacting stiffer sanctions due to resistance from China and Russia, two of its five permanent members. In November Sudanese authorities roughed up two visiting members of the sanctions committees’ panel of experts. 
 
"The African Union played an increasingly prominent role in Darfur. In April 2005 the AU requested, and the Sudanese government agreed, to a further deployment to total 7,700 military and police for AMIS’ expanded mission. Donors pledged U.S. $291 million for the project, including logistical assistance for this deployment from NATO, the E.U., the U.N., the U.K., the U.S., Canada, France and others. AMIS’ peace support efforts in Darfur had mixed results. Although AMIS troops contributed to some measure of improved security and civilian protection in those areas where they were deployed, the mission was plagued by continuing logistical and financial problems. The AU's efforts at mediating peace talks on Darfur were not as successful; sharp leadership clashes within the SLA, which had the most forces in the field of all the rebel groups, left the group unable to make decisions at the negotiating table.

"The north-south peace agreement, however, had major human rights defects, including the absence of any mechanism to ensure accountability for abuses committed during the twenty-one year war waged mostly in southern Sudan. 
 
"While it is too early to judge his potential for bringing democratic changes to the southern Sudan, Garang's successor and long-time deputy, Gen.Salva Kiir, had been a low-profile leader within the Sudan People’s Liberation Army (SPLA) for reforms to promote accountability within the movement. One early indication is favorable: Gen. Salva Kiir instructed that the selection process for legislators to both the regional and national assemblies be opened up to public participation, as there was no time to organize elections. Southerners rushed to take part. While many obstacles exist to the creation of a southern government that is transparent and accountable and enforces human rights, this early willingness to let people choose their representatives is a good sign. They already enjoy more human rights than do their northern fellow citizens, in that the presence of security forces in the southern garrison towns is lessened and there has been more free speech, free press and free assembly in the south than for decades. The national army, however, has not withdrawn from the south but under the peace agreement it has about two years to complete this process.

2007
In June 2007, the Khartoum government rebuffed appeals by the new French foreign minister, Bernard Kouchner, to allow a UN-African Union force into Darfur." Chad, on the eastern border of Darfur, is a traditional French client.

"The United Nations has been struggling for nearly a year to persuade President Omar Hassan Ahmed Bashir to allow a hybrid U.N.-African Union force of up to 23,000 peacekeepers into Darfur to protect villagers from roving Arab militias that have led the slaughter of an estimated 200,000 people and the displacement of millions more. The pressure on Bashir has been mounting recently, with an announcement of tightened sanctions from President Bush, threats of sanctions from the United Nations and the election of a new French president who promises to make Darfur a priority.

"Khartoum blinked on Tuesday; after two days of meetings in Ethiopia between Sudanese and African Union officials, Sudan agreed to accept the hybrid force... Bashir is a master at sidestepping international sanctions by pretending to accede to U.N. demands, then setting up bureaucratic roadblocks. Efforts to reinforce the 7,000 African Union troops already in Darfur have been blocked by refusals to grant visas or "complications" in customs. And when Khartoum runs out of ways to gum up the works, it simply backtracks on its agreements, as it did after initially accepting the full U.N. deployment in November.

"The backtracking might already be in progress. One of the prime points of contention over the new peacekeeping force is the nationality of the troops. Sudan has long insisted that only Africans be deployed in Darfur, but there aren't enough African troops available for the mission. On Tuesday, Mutrif Siddig, the head of the Sudanese delegation, seemed to put that issue to rest: "If there are not enough contributions from Africa, then troops can be brought in from elsewhere," he said. Yet a day earlier, Bashir told French Foreign Minister Bernard Kouchner that only Africans would be accepted. It's not the first time Bashir and his ministers have sent contradictory signals, and the result is always the same: no progress.

Sudan's agreement sounds great, but the international community must keep up the pressure until there are thousands more troops in Darfur—wearing the U.N.'s blue helmets."

The Sudan Tribune reported on July 27, 2007, that
Sudan’s interior minister accused Central Intelligence Agency of smuggling weapons into the troubled region of Darfur.

Interior Minister Zubair Bashir Taha addressing a crowd consisting of youth organizations said that the CIA is seeking to “disrupt the demographics of Darfur”.

The US special envoy to Darfur Andrew Natsios told reporters in Khartoum last week that Arab groups from neighboring countries were resettling in West Darfur and other lands traditionally belonging to local African tribes.

Taha accused the US of being responsible for “prolonging the war in Darfur and the death of thousands of people after the Abuja peace agreement just like they did in Iraq”.
Interior Minister Zubair Taha offered no evidence for his allegations.

Salah Gosh, head of Khartoum's intelligence organization, said they have maintained strong relationships with US agencies, in the context of counter-terror. In yet another of the situation where US interests in counter-terror and human rights are at odds with another, especially when the two interests are in different parts of Sudan, Gosh told the Al-Ahdath daily from Libya that the cooperation with the US “helped avert devastating measures [by US administration] against Sudan”. The US had flown Gosh to the US in April 2005 to discuss capture of terror suspects. Gosh also is suspected of complicity in human rights abuses in Darfur, so he was subsequently denied admission to the US for medical treatment.

US human rights groups want no contact with Gosh has orchestrated human right abuses in the war ravaged region of Darfur. The widespread criticism forced the US administration to subsequently deny Gosh entry to seek medical treatment for a heart condition.

The extent of cooperation is not clear. In July 2006, president Omar Al-Bashir told reporters that cooperation with CIA was on a limited basis. A spokesman for Sudan's National Security and Intelligence Service told the government sponsored Sudanese Media Center (SMC) that cooperation with CIA is taking place within the Sudan's boundaries only.

But Sudan's former foreign minister Mustafa Ismail speaking to Los Angeles Times in 2005, said that his government “already has served as the eyes and ears of the CIA in Somalia”. Gosh and Sudan, in spite of the Darfur situation, have been reported, by the Sudan Tribune, to have provided HUMINT from Iraq.

The US special envoy to Darfur Andrew Natsios told reporters in Khartoum last week that Arab groups from neighboring countries were resettling in West Darfur and other lands traditionally belonging to local African tribes.

Taha accused the US of being responsible for “prolonging the war in Darfur and the death of thousands of people after the Abuja peace agreement just like they did in Iraq”. Taha offered no specific evidence that the US was arming anyone in Darfur.

References

Sudan
Politics of Sudan
Sudan–United States relations
Sudan